Benjamin syndrome is a type of multiple congenital anomaly/intellectual disability (MCA/MR) syndrome. It is characterized by hypochromic anemia with intellectual disability and various craniofacial and other anomalies. It can also include heart murmur, dental caries and splenic tumors.

It was first described in the medical literature in 1911. Symptoms include megalocephaly, external ear deformities, dental caries, micromelia, hypoplastic bone deformities, hypogonadism, hypochromic anemia with occasional tumors, and intellectual disability.

References

External links
 Benjamin syndrome via National Library of Medicine.

Congenital disorders
Syndromes affecting blood
Genetic disorders with no OMIM
Rare syndromes